Aleksei Viktorovich Tishchenko (born 29 May 1984) is a former Russian Olympic boxer best known to dominate the lower weight classes in the last years winning numerous titles. He was regarded as "one of the best pound for pound Olympic boxers in the world".

He was born in Omsk, Soviet Union.

Career

Pressure fighter Tishchenko won the Featherweight Gold medal at the 2004 Summer Olympics. He qualified for the Athens Games by ending up in first place at the 2nd AIBA European 2004 Olympic Qualifying Tournament in Warsaw, Poland.

Tishchenko also won the featherweight gold medal at the 2005 World Amateur Boxing Championships in Mianyang, China.

In 2005 he was part of the Russian team that won the 2005 Boxing World Cup.

2006 he went up to lightweight and immediately won the European title in Plovdiv.

As of 2007 he has been elected into the Omsk Regional Duma for United Russia. At the same year at the world championships he was upset by Englishman Frankie Gavin.

At the 2008 Beijing Olympics, he benefitted from Gavin's absence and won the gold medal by defeating French boxer Daouda Sow in the final.

On 11 February 2011 he announced about finishing his career.

Amateur results 
2004 Olympic Games in Athens, Greece
Defeated Hadj Belkheir (Algeria) 37-17
Defeated Shahin Imranov (Azerbaijan) RSC-3 (1:08)
Defeated Galib Jafarov (Kazakhstan) 40-22
Defeated Jo Seok-Hwan (South Korea) 45-25
Defeated Kim Song-Guk (North Korea) 39-17

2006 European Amateur Championships in Plovdiv, Bulgaria
Defeated Odiseas Saridis (Greece) RSC-2
Defeated Samet Huseinov (Bulgaria) AB-2
Defeated Oleksandr Klyuchko (Ukraine) 42:29
Defeated Hrachik Javakhyan (Armenia) 39:15

2007 World Amateur Championships in Chicago, United States
Defeated Kim Joung-Won (South Korea) 27-20
Defeated Hüsnü Koçabas (Netherlands) RSC 3 (1:34)
Defeated Pichai Sayotha (Thailand) RSC 3 (1:40)
Lost to Frankie Gavin (England) 10-19

2008 Olympic Games in Beijing, China
Defeated Saifeddine Nejmaoui (Tunisia) 10-2	
Defeated Anthony Little (Australia) 11-3
Defeated Darley Pérez (Colombia) 13-5
Defeated Hrachik Javakhyan (Armenia) 10-5
Defeated Daouda Sow (France) 11-9

References

External links
Official site of Tischenko

1984 births
Boxers at the 2004 Summer Olympics
Boxers at the 2008 Summer Olympics
Olympic boxers of Russia
Olympic gold medalists for Russia
Living people
Sportspeople from Omsk
Olympic medalists in boxing
Medalists at the 2008 Summer Olympics
Medalists at the 2004 Summer Olympics
Russian male boxers
AIBA World Boxing Championships medalists
Featherweight boxers